Northwest Harbor is a hamlet and census-designated place (CDP) in the Town of East Hampton, Suffolk County, New York, United States. The population was 3,317 at the 2010 census.

It is named for the bay on the South Fork of Long Island connecting Sag Harbor, Shelter Island and the town of East Hampton to Gardiners Bay and the open waters of the Atlantic Ocean. The bay derives its name from being northwest of East Hampton village. The name "Northwest Harbor" is applied to the Northwest Woods neighborhood (sometimes shortened to simply "Northwest") of the town of East Hampton. It is also applied to Northwest Landing at Northwest Creek (a saltwater outlet from the inlet to the harbor) which was the first port for East Hampton and which became a major whaling port in the late 17th and early 18th centuries until it was replaced by Sag Harbor two miles to the west of the landing, where the water was deeper. Ships of Sag Harbor must pass through Northwest Harbor at the Cedar Point Lighthouse in order to reach Gardiners Bay and the open ocean.

During the American Revolution it was the site of two conflicts, including Meigs Raid in which Americans burned Sag Harbor and captured 90 British soldiers and an incident in which Isaac Van Scoy killed a British soldier with a pitchfork.  The British were to conduct another raid during the War of 1812.

During the Great Hurricane of 1938 sand all but enclosed the harbor at its mouth at the Cedar Point Lighthouse, leaving only a narrow channel into Gardiners Bay.

In January 2007 Northwest Landing made national news in efforts to save several common dolphins that had swum up the creek.

Geography

Demographics

Demographics of the CDP
As of the census of 2000, there were 3,059 people, 1,181 households, and 818 families residing in the CDP. The population density was 210.6 per square mile (81.3/km2). There were 3,008 housing units at an average density of 207.1/sq mi (80.0/km2). The racial makeup of the CDP was 90.49% White, 3.63% African American, 0.16% Native American, 1.05% Asian, 0.03% Pacific Islander, 2.62% from other races, and 2.03% from two or more races. Hispanic or Latino of any race were 9.15% of the population.

There were 1,181 households, out of which 33.8% had children under the age of 18 living with them, 55.2% were married couples living together, 9.2% had a female householder with no husband present, and 30.7% were non-families. 22.6% of all households were made up of individuals, and 8.2% had someone living alone who was 65 years of age or older. The average household size was 2.59 and the average family size was 3.04.

In the CDP, the population was spread out, with 25.2% under the age of 18, 4.8% from 18 to 24, 27.3% from 25 to 44, 28.7% from 45 to 64, and 13.9% who were 65 years of age or older. The median age was 41 years. For every 100 females, there were 98.0 males. For every 100 females age 18 and over, there were 96.5 males.

The median income for a household in the CDP was $61,808, and the median income for a family was $78,873. Males had a median income of $51,469 versus $41,161 for females. The per capita income for the CDP was $35,112. About 4.4% of families and 5.3% of the population were below the poverty line, including 4.2% of those under age 18 and 10.3% of those age 65 or over.

Schools
 East Hampton Union Free School District

References

East Hampton (town), New York
Census-designated places in New York (state)
Census-designated places in Suffolk County, New York
Populated coastal places in New York (state)